Joliot-Curie is a surname shared by several notable people, among them being:

 Frédéric Joliot-Curie – French physicist and Nobel prize-winner
 Irène Joliot-Curie – his wife and joint prize-winner with her husband

See also
Joliot
Curie

Compound surnames
French-language surnames